Madineni Venkat Ratnam (born 1973) is an Indian atmospheric scientist, Heading Aerosol, Radiation and Trace gases Group at the National Atmospheric Research Laboratory of Department of Space, Government of India. He is known for his studies on middle atmospheric structure and dynamics.

Early life and education 
Born on 21 January 1973, at Armoor in Nizamabad district of the south Indian state of Andhra Pradesh to Madineni Ramayya and Madineni Aademma.

Career 
He has published a number of articles; ResearchGate, an online repository of scientific articles has listed 182 of them. The Council of Scientific and Industrial Research, the apex agency of the Government of India for scientific research, awarded him the Shanti Swarup Bhatnagar Prize for Science and Technology, one of the highest Indian science awards, for his contributions to Earth, Atmosphere, Ocean and Planetary Sciences in 2018.

Selected bibliography 
 
 </ref>

See also 

 Atmosphere of Earth
 Gravitational wave

Notes

References

Further reading

External links 
 
 
 

Indian scientific authors
Living people
1973 births
Scientists from Andhra Pradesh
People from Nizamabad district
Recipients of the Shanti Swarup Bhatnagar Award in Earth, Atmosphere, Ocean & Planetary Sciences